Symphyotrichum sericeum (formerly Aster sericeus) is a species of flowering plant in the family Asteraceae native to central North America. Its flowers have purple ray florets and pink then purple disk florets, and its leaves are firm and silvery-green.

Description
Symphyotrichum sericeum is a perennial herb growing from rhizomes. Leaf texture is sericeous, giving the leaves a silvery-green appearance. The inflorescences are erect and parallel, and the involucral bracts of the flower heads are ovate to lanceolate in shape and sericeous. The flowers have purple ray florets and pink then purple disk florets. The fruit is a cypsela.

Conservation
, NatureServe listed Symphyotrichum sericeum as Secure (G5) worldwide, last reviewed in 2002, with state and province statuses as follows: Critically Imperiled (S1) in Ontario and Oklahoma; and, Imperiled (S2) in Manitoba, North Dakota, Michigan, Indiana, and Arkansas.

Citations

References

sericeum
Flora of Canada
Flora of the United States
Plants described in 1800
Taxa named by Étienne Pierre Ventenat